Ma'afu Fia (born 22 November 1989) is a Tongan International rugby union prop who most recently played rugby for Ospreys in the URC, having previously represented the Highlanders in Super Rugby.

Early life
Fia was born in Tonga and moved to New Zealand in 2001. He went to school with Aaron Cruden, Andre Taylor and Kurt Baker.

Playing career

Provincial Rugby
Fia had a stellar year in 2009 as he broke into the Manawatu provincial squad for the Air New Zealand Cup competition and helped New Zealand to the IRB World Under-20 title. As a result, he was named Manawatu's Outstanding Junior Sportsperson for 2009.

In the 2010 ITM Cup, Fia established himself as a starter at prop for Manawatu, and scored his first provincial try. In the 2011 ITM Cup, he was a key part of a vastly improved Turbos squad.

Super Rugby

Fia signed with the Highlanders for the 2012 Super Rugby season. He spent 4 seasons with the Highlanders and was a member of their 2015 Super Rugby championship squad, although he was sidelined for most of the season through a knee injury.

Pro 14

On 5 October 2015, Fia signed a 3-year contract with the Ospreys. On 17 September 2016, he scored his first Ospreys try against Treviso in round 3.

International

Fia was born in Tonga but moved to New Zealand in 2001 at the age of 11, and represented New Zealand at youth levels. He is a 2009 IRB Junior World Championship winner, with New Zealand.

He made his debut for the Tonga Rugby Union on 17 November 2018, against Wales. He was selected for his first Rugby World Cup in 2019.

References

External links
Manawatu Profile

1989 births
Living people
Tongan rugby union players
Rugby union props
Highlanders (rugby union) players
Manawatu rugby union players
Tongan emigrants to New Zealand
People educated at Palmerston North Boys' High School
Ospreys (rugby union) players
People from Tongatapu
Tonga international rugby union players
Bath Rugby players